Michael Peter Bernard (born 10 January 1948) is an English former footballer who played in the Football League for Everton, Oldham Athletic and Stoke City.

Career
Bernard started his career in the youth ranks at his local team Shrewsbury Town before joining Stoke City in 1965 after impressing in a youth team match between the two sides. He made his debut during the 1965–66 season and became a regular in Tony Waddington's first team by 1967–68. He became useful player who was able to play at full back and in midfield and was a member of Stoke's 1972 League Cup winning squad. Bernard then became the first member of the squad to leave as after making 178 appearances he was sold to Everton in April 1972 for a then club record £140,000.

Bernard spent five seasons at Goodison Park earning a League Cup runner-up medal in 1977. After making 171 appearances for the "Toffees" he left for Oldham Athletic, but had to end his career after a serious calf injury.

After retirement
Bernard later ran a pub in Chester and also spent time working on the commercial side at Crewe Alexandra and later at Stoke for a short period. He then moved to live in Portugal.

Career statistics
Source:

Honours
Stoke City
Football League Cup winners: 1972

Everton
Football League Cup runner-up: 1977

References

External links
 
 

1948 births
Sportspeople from Shrewsbury
English Football League players
England under-23 international footballers
Stoke City F.C. players
Everton F.C. players
Oldham Athletic A.F.C. players
Living people
Cleveland Stokers players
United Soccer Association players
English footballers
Association football midfielders
English expatriate sportspeople in the United States
Expatriate soccer players in the United States
English expatriate footballers